Ao Feifan (born January 24, 1989) is a professional Chinese footballer who currently plays as a defensive midfielder for Jilin Baijia in the China League Two.

Club career
Ao Feifan was promoted to Shanghai East Asia's first team squad in 2006. On 10 February 2010, Ao transferred to China League One side Hubei Greenery. On 20 October 2013, he made his debut for Wuhan in the 2013 Chinese Super League against Shanghai East Asia.

In March 2014, Ao transferred to China League Two side Jiangxi Liansheng.

Career statistics 
Statistics accurate as of match played 12 October 2019.

References

1989 births
Living people
Chinese footballers
Footballers from Hubei
Shanghai Port F.C. players
Wuhan F.C. players
Jiangxi Beidamen F.C. players
Chinese Super League players
China League One players
Association football midfielders
21st-century Chinese people